Richard Filler Taruskin (April 2, 1945 – July 1, 2022) was an American musicologist and music critic who was among the leading and most prominent music historians of his generation. The breadth of his scrutiny into source material as well as musical analysis that combines sociological, cultural, and political perspectives, has incited much discussion, debate and controversy. He regularly wrote music criticism for newspapers including The New York Times. He researched a wide variety of areas, but a central topic was the Russian music of the 18th century to present day. Other subjects he engaged with include the theory of performance, 15th-century music, 20th-century classical music, nationalism in music, the theory of modernism, and analysis. He is best known for his monumental survey of Western classical music, the six-volume Oxford History of Western Music. He received several awards, including the first Noah Greenberg Award from the American Musicological Society in 1978, and the Kyoto Prize in Arts and Philosophy in 2017.

Early life and education
Richard Filler Taruskin was born on April 2, 1945, in New York, Taruskin was raised in a family described as liberal, intellectual, Jewish and musical; his mother, Beatrice (Filler), was a piano teacher and father, Benjamin Taruskin, an amateur violinist. He attended the High School of Music & Art, now part of Fiorello H. LaGuardia High School, where he studied cello. Taruskin went on to receive his B.A. magna cum laude (1965), M.A. (1968), and Ph.D. in historical musicology (1976) from Columbia University. As a choral conductor he directed the Columbia University Collegium Musicum. He played the viola da gamba with the Aulos Ensemble from the late 1970s to the late 1980s.

During his PhD studies, he worked with Paul Henry Lang, who had pioneered placing music within its socio-cultural context, as in Music in Western Civilization. Through a family member who had stayed in Russia after the Revolution, Taruskin had access to recordings of Russian operas besides the most familiar ones, which sparked his interest in Russian music. He went to Moscow for a year on a Fulbright Scholarship, where he was interested not only in the language and music, but also in the way music connects to social and political history. In the 1980s, he explored the archives of Igor Stravinsky, when they were held by the New York Public Library.

Career
Taruskin was on the faculty of Columbia University from 1975 until 1986. He then moved to California as a professor of musicology at the University of California, Berkeley, where he held the Class of 1955 Chair. He retired from Berkeley at the end of 2014.

Taruskin published his first book in 1981, Opera and Drama in Russia as Preached and Practiced in the 1860s. He also wrote extensively for lay readers, including numerous articles in The New York Times beginning in the mid 1980s. They were often "lively, erudite, fiercely articulate" and controversial, with targets for example Elliott Carter, Carl Orff, and Sergei Prokofiev. Many of the articles were collected in books, Text and Act, a volume which exhibits him as having been an influential critic of the premises of the "historically informed performance" movement in classical music, The Danger of Music and Other Anti-Utopian Essays, and On Russian Music. His writings frequently took up social, cultural, and political issues in connection with music—for example, the question of censorship. A specific instance was the debate over John Adams’s opera The Death of Klinghoffer.

Taruskin's extensive 1996 study Stravinsky and the Russian Traditions: A Biography of the Works through Mavra showed that Igor Stravinsky drew more heavily on Russian folk material than had previously been recognized, and analyzed the historical trends that caused Stravinsky not to be forthcoming about some of these borrowings.

His survey of Western classical music appeared as the six-volume Oxford History of Western Music. The first volume, devoted to Music from the Earliest Notations to the Sixteenth Century, is weaving "facts and impressions from histories, visual art and architecture" as a transporting introduction to early music.

Personal life and death
Taruskin married Cathy Roebuck in 1984, and they had two children. He died from esophageal cancer at a hospital in Oakland, California, on July 1, 2022, aged 77.

Awards and honors
Taruskin received numerous awards and honors for his scholarship. In 1978, he was the first recipient of the Noah Greenberg Award from the American Musicological Society (AMS) for his research and recording of Ockeghem's Missa prolationum. He received the Alfred Einstein Award (1980) from the AMS; and the Dent Medal (1987) from the Royal Musical Association. He received the Otto Kinkeldey Award from the AMS twice, in 1997 and 2006. In 1998, he was elected to the American Philosophical Society. The American Society of Composers, Authors and Publishers awarded him the Deems Taylor Award in 1988, and later in 2006. In 2017 he was the recipient of the Kyoto Prize in Arts and Philosophy (Music).

In 2012, a conference honoring him and his work, After the End of Music History, was held at Princeton University.

Publications
Sources:

Books

  Republished in 1993, Rochester: University of Rochester Press

Chapters

Articles

References

Notes

Citations

Sources

Further reading

External links
 
 DeVoto, Mark: Richard Taruskin, 1945–2022. The Boston Musical Intelligencer, July 1, 2022
 

1945 births
2022 deaths
20th-century American male writers
20th-century American non-fiction writers
21st-century American male writers
21st-century American non-fiction writers
American choral conductors
American male non-fiction writers
American musicologists
Columbia College (New York) alumni
Columbia University faculty
Critics employed by The New York Times
Deaths from cancer in California
Deaths from esophageal cancer
Honorary Members of the Royal Academy of Music
Jewish American writers
Jewish musicologists
Kyoto laureates in Arts and Philosophy
Stravinsky scholars
Tchaikovsky scholars
University of California, Berkeley faculty
Viol players
Writers from New York City